Unicorn is the third studio album by English psychedelic folk (later glam rock) band Tyrannosaurus Rex (later known as T. Rex). It was released on 16 May 1969 by record labels Regal Zonophone and Blue Thumb, and was the last Tyrannosaurus Rex album to feature Steve Peregrin Took.

Content and music 

Unicorn featured Marc Bolan on vocals, guitar, organ and phonofiddle and Took on percussion, bass and piano. The back cover depicted Bolan and Took surrounded by books that were relevant to the subject matter of the songs. These books included the work of William Blake as well as photographs of the Cottingley Fairies, a famous case of two children's photographs of alleged fairies taken near their Yorkshire home.

In between the final two songs on the album, "The Misty Coast of Albany" and "Romany Soup", John Peel (an early supporter of the band) recited a short story written by Bolan.

Bolan experimented with an electric guitar for the first time on a Tyrannosaurus Rex record and Took played less congas and used a (toy) full drum kit.

Release 
Unicorn was released on 16 May 1969 by Regal Zonophone in the UK and Blue Thumb in the US; it was their first album to be released in the US. It reached No. 12 in the UK Albums Chart.

Unicorn was the last of Tyrannosaurus Rex's albums to feature Took; Bolan fired him after refusing to include Took's songs on the next album.

In 2004, the album was remastered and reissued by A&M Records.

Critical reception and legacy

In a retrospective review, AllMusic praised most of the songs saying, "Cat Black", "comes on like a lost Spector classic, with apoplectic percussion and a positively soaring, wordless chorus". The reviewer wrote that some songs predated the transition from acoustic full mode to electric music, with this remark "you can hear the future".

Songwriter and musician Luke Haines of the Auteurs dubbed it a "genius" album and praised Took for his contributions on the record.

Track listing

Personnel
Tyrannosaurus Rex
Marc Bolan – acoustic and electric guitars, lead vocals, harmonium, organ, phonofiddle
Steve Peregrin Took – drums, bongos, backing vocals, African talking drum, bass, piano
Additional Personnel
Tony Visconti – production, piano (A5)
John Peel – narration (B8)

References

External links 

 

T. Rex (band) albums
1969 albums
Albums produced by Tony Visconti
Albums recorded at Trident Studios
Regal Zonophone Records albums
Blue Thumb Records albums